Gerald E. Dennerlein (December 1, 1915 – July 29, 1966) was an American football player. He played a total of 22 games and started nine for the New York Giants.

References

1915 births
1966 deaths
American football tackles
Saint Mary's Gaels football players
New York Giants players
Players of American football from Pennsylvania
People from Ambridge, Pennsylvania